Holly J. Mitchell (born September 7, 1964) is an American politician currently serving as a member of the Los Angeles County Board of Supervisors.

A Democrat, Mitchell served as a State Senator for California's 30th senate district from 2013 to 2020, which is also part of Supervisorial District 2 and encompasses Culver City, Ladera Heights, Exposition Park, and parts of the Westmont, Florence, Crenshaw, Del Rey, Los Angeles Downtown Los Angeles. She previously represented the 26th Senate District after replacing then-Senator Curren Price in a 2013 special election. Prior to being elected to the State Senate, she served in the California State Assembly representing the 54th Assembly District.

Mitchell is a member of the California Legislative Black Caucus. In 2016 Mitchell became the first African American to Chair the Senate Budget and Fiscal Review Committee, where she has overseen the passage and adoption of two consecutive state budgets.

Early career 
Before working in the Legislature, she served for seven years as CEO of the nonprofit Crystal Stairs. She also served as a Consultant to the Senate Health Committee, and as a legislative advocate for the Western Center on Law and Poverty.

California State Senate 
In 2018, Mitchell was named vice chair of the Joint Legislative Subcommittee on Sexual Harassment Prevention and Response, formed in response to the #MeToo movement and several instances where accusations had forced some lawmakers to resign. Mitchell was the first African-American to serve as Chair of the Senate Budget and Fiscal Review Committee, overseeing the passage of state budgets totaling over $200 billion.

In 2019, Mitchell drafted and sponsored the CROWN (Create a Respectful and Open Workplace for Natural Hair) Act (SB 188), a California law which prohibits discrimination based on hair style and hair texture by extending protection under the FEHA and the California Education Code. It is the first legislation passed at the state level in the United States to prohibit such discrimination.  The Act passed unanimously in both chambers of the California Legislature by June 27, 2019, and was signed into law on July 3, 2019.  The law has since inspired similar laws across the country.

Los Angeles County Board of Supervisors 
Mitchell faced Los Angeles City Councilmember Herb Wesson in the 2020 race for District 2 of the Los Angeles County Board of Supervisors. She defeated Wesson by a wide margin. Her election to the Los Angeles County Board of Supervisors in 2020 marks the first time the board is composed entirely of women.  Mitchell generated controversy when she said, "Law enforcement and the District Attorneys Association and the Sheriffs’ Association, who just when you look at who represents them in Sacramento, is clearly such White supremacist organizations."

References

External links 

Campaign website
Join California Holly Mitchell

1964 births
20th-century African-American people
20th-century African-American women
21st-century African-American politicians
21st-century African-American women
21st-century American politicians
21st-century American women politicians
African-American state legislators in California
African-American women in politics
Democratic Party California state senators
Living people
Democratic Party members of the California State Assembly
People from South Los Angeles
Politicians from Los Angeles
University of California, Riverside alumni
Women state legislators in California